The Continental Basketball Association statistical leaders are the statistical leaders in various different categories of the American professional club basketball league, which ceased operations after the 2008–09 season.

Key

Annual scoring leaders

Annual rebounding leaders

Annual assists leaders

Annual steals leaders

Annual blocks leaders

Career scoring leaders
The table includes the all-time scoring leaders of the EPBL (Eastern Pennsylvania Basketball League 1946–48, and Eastern Professional Basketball League 1948–70), the EBA (Eastern Basketball Association 1970–78) and the CBA (1978–2009).

Notes

References

Bibliography

External links

CBA Players - League Leaders, InsideHoops.com

Continental Basketball Association lists